The Santa Galla church is a place of Catholic worship in Rome located in the Ostiense district, in via Circonvallazione Ostiense.

History

It was built in 1940 by architect Tullio Rossi, and was consecrated by Cardinal Ugo Poletti on the 50th anniversary of the parish foundation December 15, 1990.

The church is home to parish, established December 13, 1940 with the decree of the Cardinal Vicar Francesco Marchetti Selvaggiani Templum in honorem. It has been visited by two popes: Pope Paul VI March 13, 1966, and Pope John Paul II on 25 January 1981.

Since February 14, 2015, it is the seat of the Cardinal title of Sancti Galle.

List of Cardinal Protectors
 Daniel Fernando Sturla Berhouet 14 February 2015 – present

References

External links
 Santa Galla 

Titular churches
Rome Q. X Ostiense
1940 establishments in Italy